Brandon  "Bam" Margera (born September 28, 1979) is an American former professional skateboarder, stunt performer, television personality, and filmmaker. He rose to prominence in the early 2000s as one of the stars of the MTV reality stunt show Jackass and subsequent sequels. He also created the Jackass spin-off shows Viva La Bam, Bam's Unholy Union, Bam's World Domination, and Bam's Bad Ass Game Show, and co-wrote and directed the films Haggard and Minghags.

Early life
Margera was born on September 28, 1979, the son of April  and Phil Margera. He is the younger brother of Jess Margera and nephew of Vincent "Don Vito" Margera. His grandfather nicknamed him "Bam Bam" at the age of three after noticing his habit of purposely running into walls; over time, that nickname was shortened to "Bam" by his schoolmates. Margera dropped out of West Chester East High School after his junior year, but was homeschooled by his mother and received his GED.

Career

Television and film
Margera began shooting videos of himself and his friends skateboarding and doing stunts, which eventually turned into the CKY video series. He independently released CKY. CKY2K, CKY3 and CKY4 have also been released. CKY stands for "Camp Kill Yourself", a name shared with his brother Jess Margera's band, CKY, which was named as a tribute to the film Sleepaway Camp. These early videos feature many of Margera's friends, including Ryan Dunn, Brandon DiCamillo, Rake Yohn, Chris Raab, and Brandon Novak, who form a loose collective known as the CKY crew. The video and band projects are heavily interlinked.

Following CKY's success, former Big Brother editor Jeff Tremaine noticed Margera's videos and drafted him into the team that would eventually become MTV's Jackass. Margera and Ryan Dunn became mainstays of the cast while other CKY crew members played supporting roles to various degrees. Margera went on to appear in Jackass: The Movie, Jackass Number Two, Jackass 2.5, Jackass 3D and Jackass 3.5. Several skits in the first Jackass movie were CKY-style pieces filmed in and around West Chester, but similar scenes in the second movie were removed after the arrest of Margera's uncle Vincent Margera on suspicion of inappropriately touching two minors.

In 2003, Margera played himself in the movie Grind, which portrays four young men following a professional skateboarder from Chicago to California. The film contains numerous cameos by Jackass members, as well as many professional skateboarders and other celebrities. Upon release, it was met with generally unfavorable reviews from critics, but was rated much higher by the general public.

After Jackass, Margera was given his own MTV series, Viva La Bam, which ran for five seasons from 2003 to 2005. The show followed Margera and his crew as they performed various stunts and missions. The show was primarily filmed in West Chester but also visited New Orleans, Las Vegas, Los Angeles, Brazil, Finland, Mexico, Netherlands, and Transylvania. In addition to the regular series, special episodes have included "Viva La Spring Break" and a "lost" episode included on the Viva La Bands CD.

In 2007, Margera was engaged and the wedding was filmed for Bam's Unholy Union as a follow-up to Viva la Bam. The show follows Margera, his then-fiancée Missy Rothstein and their friends in the lead-up to their wedding. In 2008, Margera had a "prominent, non-sex role" in a pornographic film by Gina Lynn, The Fantasstic Whores 4, with Brandon Novak. In 2009, Margera appeared on Nitro Circus.

In October 2010, Margera appeared in Jackass 3D and the movie broke box office records.

Margera appears with Dunn and skateboarder Tim O'Connor on Bam's World Domination, a half-hour Spike TV program that debuted on October 13, 2010. The first episode showcased Margera and his friends' attempt to conquer an obstacle course race in the Tough Guy Competition, held in Staffordshire, England.

In March 2016, Bam and his mother April Margera appeared on the VH1 reality television show Family Therapy with Dr. Jenn to address Bam's self-destructive behavior.

Skateboarding career

In the beginning of his career, during 1997 and 1998, Margera was sponsored by Toy Machine Skateboards. From 2001, Margera was a member of Team Element, the demonstration team for Element Skateboards.

As of 2016, Margera is no longer on the team. He was also at various times sponsored by Speed Metal Bearings, Adio Footwear, Electric Sunglasses, Volcom, Landspeed Wheels, Destroyer Trucks, Destructo Trucks, and Fairman's Skateshop.

As of 2022, Margera is without any major sponsorships and has effectively retired from professional skateboarding. He did return to skating casually, resulting in a renewed partnership with Element Skateboards to celebrate the brand's 25th anniversary by rereleasing a series of ten of his most memorable deck designs. The boards were released weekly between September 6 and November 8, 2017. Each deck is signed by Margera and limited to 50 units.

Independent films 
Margera has written, produced and starred in three independent films. He co-wrote, directed and starred in Haggard (2003), an independent film based on real events in the life of his friend Ryan Dunn. Dunn played himself as the main character while Margera played "Valo", a character based on himself and elements of HIM singer and friend Ville Valo.

Margera also directed Minghags, formerly titled Kiss a Good Man's Ass. The film is a loose sequel to Haggard and features the "garbage juicer" invention from that film. Filming started April 5, 2007. On an episode of Radio Bam, Margera said that they were trying to make the movie PG-13 rated, but with the amount of swearing and a shot of nudity, an R rating could not be avoided. The first viewing of the rough version of the film was on August 7, 2007, at Sikes Hall. The movie was released straight to DVD in December 2008.

Also in December 2008, Margera released a Christmas-themed movie, Bam Margera Presents: Where the#$&% Is Santa?. The movie is about Bam and his friends going to the Arctic Circle in Finland on a quest to find Santa Claus. The film features Ville Valo from HIM, the Dudesons, Hanoi Rocks, and Mark the Bagger.

Radio Bam and music
Margera began a weekly Sirius Satellite Radio show on Sirius channel 28 Faction on November 24, 2004, called Radio Bam. The show initially featured Margera and his friends from the CKY and Jackass crews. Later shows featured less of the two crews and more of Margera's newer friends.

In 2005, Margera started a music label, Filthy Note Records, and has directed music videos for Clutch, Turbonegro, Viking Skull, Vains of Jenna and several for CKY. He also directed four music videos, "Buried Alive by Love", "The Sacrament", "And Love Said No", and "Solitary Man", for the Finnish band HIM, and three for The 69 Eyes, "Lost Boys", "Dead Girls are Easy" and "Dead N Gone". He also plays the keyboard in a novelty band called Gnarkill along with Brandon DiCamillo, Jess Margera, Rich Vose and Matt Cole.

Margera's band, Fuckface Unstoppable, was written about in 2013 on the Buddyhead website and the article questions the seriousness of the band ("a joke band(?)"). The band featured Margera, his brother (Jess Margera), his girlfriend and Brandon Novak. Chad Ginsburg, of CKY, was the band's guitarist before quitting. Matt Deis, also of CKY, performed with the band as well. The band released their debut album titled FFU on May 27, 2014, through Artery Records. A deluxe edition of the album featuring five live performances at Zombie Hut and a bonus track was released on August 28, 2015, through Casual Madness.

The Evesdroppers, a new band featuring Bam, Jess, Nikki, Mike Nappi, and Chad I Ginsburg, released a self-titled album on September 28, 2016, through Casual Madness.

Documentary
In January 2015, Margera announced that he had been working on an autobiographical documentary film which he hoped to premiere in the near future. On April 9, the first trailer for the film, titled I Need Time to Stay Useless, was released to YouTube and other media outlets. The film will deal primarily with Margera's life after the death of his close friend and co-star, Ryan Dunn, who died in a car crash in 2011. According to Margera the film has been three years in the making, and will give viewers a glimpse into his childhood, career and rise to fame, while focusing mainly on his recovery from the death of Dunn. Musician Brent Hinds of the band Mastodon will play Dunn in what has been described as "dramatic fantasy interludes" that ties the film together while also re-enacting what Margera considers his "darkest moments" after Dunn's death.

During a Facebook Q&A on December 7, 2015, Margera stated that the name of the film would change from I Need Time to Stay Useless to Earth Rocker and that it would be released February 2016. In the 2017 season premier of Vice's Epicly Later'd, Margera stated that after working on the film for four years straight, sometimes for weeks at a time, he had reached the point where he had had enough of doing so. Margera stated that he had approximately eleven terabytes worth of video footage and that editing it down into a two-hour film was impossible. When asked if the project was on pause for the moment, he responded that it was.

Other projects
Margera has been animated as a character in the Tony Hawk's video game franchise, specifically Tony Hawk's Pro Skater 3, Tony Hawk's Pro Skater 4, Tony Hawk's Underground, Tony Hawk's Underground 2, Tony Hawk's American Wasteland, Tony Hawk's Project 8 and Tony Hawk's Proving Ground. He also voiced a character in the video game Scarface: The World Is Yours. He made cameo appearances in the movies Grind and Destroying America.

In late September 2008, Margera opened a bar/theater called "The Note", in his hometown of West Chester, Pennsylvania. Serious restrictions from West Chester Borough Council caused a multitude of issues for Margera and the bar, and The Note closed its doors in January 2014.

In late 2009, Margera released a book containing private writings and pictures titled Serious as Dog Dirt.

In 2020, Margera started appearing in YouTube videos including a viral water balloon fight video with model Jeb Carty.

Personal life

Relationships
Margera was engaged to Jenn Rivell, who played a prominent part in several of his projects. The couple appeared to be cohabiting in various episodes of Viva La Bam. Their seven-year relationship ended in 2005. In November 2006, Margera filed for "protection from abuse" from Rivell after she allegedly broke into his house.

In 2006, Margera became engaged to childhood friend Melissa "Missy" Rothstein. The events leading up to their wedding (with about 350 friends and family in attendance) on February 3, 2007, in downtown Philadelphia, were chronicled on the MTV series Bam's Unholy Union. The couple's honeymoon was in Dubai. In 2008, during an appearance on LA Ink, Margera told Kat Von D about $13,000 in damage that occurred during his wedding celebration, explaining, "I was kind of ready for it, though. I was like, 'I'm inviting the Jackass crew. If something doesn't get broken then that's not right.'"

In July 2009, Margera was taken to hospital by paramedics and state troopers after Rothstein called 911 following a four-day alcohol binge. In regard to the drinking binge, Margera said, "I may get a divorce... booze helps." In October 2010, Margera told Howard Stern that he and Rothstein were living in separate cities, they meet once a week, and that Rothstein knew that he had girlfriends. The couple divorced in November 2012.

On October 5, 2013, Margera married Nicole Boyd in Reykjavík, Iceland. In June 2017, Margera announced that Boyd was pregnant with the couple's first child. In September 2017, it was announced that the child, a boy, would be named Phoenix Wolf. Margera's son was born on December 23, 2017.

Name and residence
In an October 24, 2007 interview with the Cleveland Free Times, Margera stated that although he had completed paperwork that would legally change his first name to Bam, he was "still debating" filing it after a conversation with his father.

Margera owns two houses in the West Chester, Pennsylvania area – his present residence and his former home, known as Castle Bam, which he bought in 2004. Castle Bam is a large house in Pocopson Township, Pennsylvania, that was often featured on Viva La Bam. In January 2007, Margera built a ramp in the backyard which caused trouble with the township. In 2018, April Margera began renovating the home in order for it to be used for short-term rentals via Airbnb. Margera has made it known that the home will not look the way it did on Viva La Bam. Rentals of the home were expected to be made available in 2018.

Alcoholism and legal troubles
Margera has had a history of alcohol abuse since his twenties. He was frequently seen drinking and/or intoxicated on-camera in Viva La Bam and in behind-the-scenes footage from the Jackass films. In July 2009, Margera was taken to the hospital by paramedics and state troopers after a four-day alcohol binge. His drinking habits had worsened after his previous shows ended in 2007. In December 2009, he entered rehab for the first time after an intervention from his friends and family, but did not complete the program, and left after only four days.

On June 12, 2010, Margera was allegedly attacked with a baseball bat outside of his bar, The Note. Margera spent the night at Crozer-Chester Medical Center, where he was treated for head injuries. According to the alleged assailant, Elizabeth Ray, it was because Margera allegedly called her a "nigger". Ray denies attacking Margera. Margera denies having said the word, claiming "I called her a crazy bitch and an idiot, but I definitely didn't use the n-word".

Following Ryan Dunn's death in 2011, Margera's drinking intensified further. By his own accounts, Margera considers 2012 as the year he lost control of his drinking, after bone spurs forced him to put skating on hold, and he began binge drinking "to kill the boredom".

In July 2013, Margera was arrested at Keflavik Airport in Iceland, having left the country without paying damages following a rental car dispute the year before. Margera had rented a Toyota Land Cruiser during a vacation in Iceland in 2012, which he had returned in "terrible shape" five days later, but left the country before paying for the damage. Margera was released later the same day after paying the outstanding fees, and admitted in an interview that he had trashed the car in a drunken stupor.

In 2015, Margera entered rehab again for alcoholism, but left shortly after without finishing the program. Later that year, he took part in Family Therapy with Dr. Jenn on VH1 with his mother, April Margera, after which he remained sober for several months. In an interview with People magazine the following year, Margera opened up about his mental health issues, including anxiety, bipolar disorder, and bulimia nervosa, and revealed how his unhealthy lifestyle had forced him to relearn skating after five years, and had also left him overweight. He then moved to Estonia for five months to get in better shape. After losing some weight, he relocated to Barcelona, Spain with his family to focus on his skating career in late 2016, but moved back to Pennsylvania in 2017, before his son was born. In a 90-minute interview with YouTube series The Nine Club recorded and released in November 2017, Margera discussed his health issues and alcoholism, claiming that he had been "mostly sober" since 2015.

In January 2018, Margera entered rehab for the third time after a DUI, and remained sober for seven months. Later that year, he relapsed after being robbed at gunpoint during a vacation in Colombia. In January 2019, one year after his previous attempt, Margera entered rehab for the fourth time, but left after ten days, stating that he "didn't belong there", and was planning on beating his alcoholism on his own. In March 2019, TMZ released a video showing Margera screaming at and threatening his manager at West Side Comedy Club in New York City. Additionally, Margera made Instagram posts in which he insulted his wife and damaged his own home, leading to friends and family members coming together to have Margera committed to a mental health treatment facility. Margera was released from treatment and returned home after one week.

On August 3, 2019, he was removed from a commercial airline flight following an altercation with an airport police officer, who told him he was too intoxicated to fly. The following day, Margera posted a chain of videos on his Instagram account, publicly pleading for Dr. Phil's help. He directed a lengthy tirade towards his mother April, wife Nikki Margera, and childhood friend Brandon Novak, candidly stating his relationship with his family is broken. Dr. Phil reciprocated Margera's pleas the next morning, referring him to a treatment center following a one-on-one session.

During a January 2021 podcast interview, Margera indicated that Paramount Pictures regards him as a liability, owing to his behavior over the last few years. He indicated that Jackass co-creator Jeff Tremaine had fought with the studio to keep Margera in the next Jackass film, Jackass Forever, but Margera still was not certain that Paramount was going to allow him to partake in the filming of the movie. On February 11, 2021, Margera posted several videos to his Instagram account, in which he admitted to breaking his sobriety, and indicated that he had officially been fired from the filming of Jackass Forever. Throughout the video, he could be seen crying, vomiting, and alluding to having looked up "how to tie a noose" before his move to Oceanside, California. Margera alleged that Paramount had been forcing him to take antidepressants, submit to random urine tests, and to check in to two different rehabilitation facilities using his own money. He also expressed disdain for Tremaine, Johnny Knoxville, and Spike Jonze, before asking his fans to boycott Jackass Forever. He then solicited his followers to send him money in order to film his own movie to compete with Jackass Forever. The videos were removed from Margera's Instagram account soon after being posted.

On May 25, 2021, it was reported that Tremaine had filed a temporary restraining order against Margera, due to Margera's harassment of both Tremaine and Knoxville via Instagram. Tremaine was granted an additional three-year restraining order, extended to Tremaine's wife and children, after Margera allegedly sent the family death threats. On August 9, 2021, Margera filed a lawsuit against Tremaine, Knoxville, and Jonze, as well as against Paramount Pictures, MTV, Dickhouse Entertainment, and Gorilla Flicks, alleging that he was wrongfully fired from the production of Jackass Forever. On January 12, 2022, Knoxville said that one scene Margera filmed for Jackass Forever would still be in the film, despite the ongoing lawsuit. They came with a settlement after Margera asked to dismiss the lawsuit on April 14, 2022. The terms of the settlement remain private.

On September 16, 2021, Margera's wife Nikki filed for child custody of their son Phoenix Wolf. However, she did not file a divorce petition to end their eight-year marriage.

On May 17, 2022, Margera announced that he had completed one year of sobriety treatment.

On June 15, 2022, Margera was reported missing after fleeing his rehab center.  He was found and voluntarily returned to rehab after being gone for a week. He was returned with police escort since he was in the rehabilitation facility under court order. On June 26, 2022, he was reported missing again after fleeing his rehab center for the second time. He was found and checked in to a new treatment facility on June 27, 2022. He was spotted at a bar after fleeing rehab once again on September 4, 2022. On September 25, 2022, it was reported that he was caught intoxicated in a bar in Atlanta, Georgia, amid rehab problems. 

On December 9, 2022, it was reported that he was hospitalized and put on a ventilator in a San Diego ICU due to pneumonia and COVID-19. He was released from the hospital the next day. On Steve-O's Wild Ride! podcast, he said that he also suffered from five seizures during his stay at the hospital.

On February 15, 2023, his wife Nikki filed for legal separation and spousal support, citing irreconcilable differences. Legal documents state that Boyd is seeking physical and legal custody and that Margera can have parental visitation as long as he and his son remain within Los Angeles County. It further details that her reasoning for filing for separation was based on Margera behaving inappropriately while spending time with their son, leading Boyd to believe Margera was under the influence.

He was arrested on March 2, 2023, for domestic violence, after he allegedly kicked a woman. He was released from custody after he posted a $50,000 bail the next day.

Filmography

Film

Television

DVDs and videos

Music videos

Video games

Discography
 With CKY
 Volume 2 (1999)

With Gnarkill
 Gnarkill (2002)
 GnarKill vs. Unkle Matt and the ShitBirdz (2006)

 With Fuckface Unstoppable
 Fuckface Unstoppable (2014)

 With the Evesdroppers
 The Evesdroppers (2016)

Books 
 Bam Margera, Serious as Dog Dirt (MTV; November 17, 2009)

References

External links

 Official website
 
 Bam Margera's skate video filmography

1979 births
American people of German descent
American skateboarders
American people of Italian descent
American stunt performers
CKY
Jackass (TV series)
Living people
Participants in American reality television series
People from West Chester, Pennsylvania
Sportspeople from the Delaware Valley
Artist skateboarders